The 1991 Louisiana gubernatorial election resulted in the election of Edwin Edwards to his fourth non-consecutive term as governor of Louisiana.  The election received national and international attention due to the unexpectedly strong showing of David Duke, a former Grand Wizard of the Knights of the Ku Klux Klan, who had ties to other white supremacist and neo-Nazi groups.

Background 
In 1991 all elections in Louisiana—with the exception of U.S. presidential elections—followed a variation of the open primary system called the jungle primary. Candidates of any and all parties are listed on one ballot; voters need not limit themselves to the candidates of one party. Unless one candidate takes 50% or more of the vote in the first round, a run-off election is then held between the top two candidates, who may in fact be members of the same party. In this election, the first round of voting was held on October 19, 1991, and the runoff was held on November 16.

In 1990, Duke mounted a campaign for the U.S. Senate, losing to incumbent Democrat J. Bennett Johnston.  Leading Republicans repudiated Duke's candidacy, citing his history as a white supremacist.

Abortive candidacies 
Public Service Commissioner Kathleen Blanco, a Democrat, announced her candidacy in May 1991. Edwards was not impressed by her entry. It was the first time in 40 years a woman had seriously run for Governor but Edwards surmised she would not get out of single digits. Blanco, who came from Acadiana, could have complicated Edwards' bid for a fourth term but after 100 days she suddenly withdrew and ran for Public Service Commissioner again.

Meanwhile, Governor Roemer was facing a potential opponent for the Republican support who could have denied him major party support he needed to stave off Holloway and Duke. Another prominent party-switcher, Secretary of State Fox McKeithen, who withdrew from a 1990 U.S. Senate bid, actively explored a gubernatorial bid. His father, former Governor John McKeithen would prove to be a strong asset had he run, but in the end McKeithen figured that his time had come and gone and ran for reelection as Secretary of State.

First primary 
After the withdrawal of Blanco and McKeithen, the field of candidates began to solidify. Then late in March, incumbent Governor Buddy Roemer changed his party affiliation from Democrat to Republican, dismaying many members of both parties. One irate Republican was the state party chairman, Billy Nungesser of New Orleans. After failing to get the Louisiana Republicans' endorsement convention canceled, Roemer announced he would skip the event. The convention, as expected, endorsed U.S. Representative Clyde C. Holloway, the favored candidate of the anti-abortion forces in the state, with whom Roemer was at odds at the time.

The first round primary gubernatorial contest included Roemer, Edwin Edwards, David Duke, and Eighth District Congressman Holloway who all ran in Louisiana's open primary. Roemer was wounded by his mistakes as governor, while Edwards and Duke each had a passionate core group of supporters. Roemer placed third in the primary. One of the contributing factors to his defeat was a last-minute advertising barrage by Marine Shale owner Jack Kent; Marine Shale had been targeted by the Roemer administration as a polluter, and Kent spent $500,000 of his own money in the closing days of the campaign to purchase anti-Roemer commercials.

Runoff campaign

Faced with the alternative of David Duke, many Louisianans who were otherwise critical of Edwards now looked favorably on him as an alternative. This included Buddy Roemer, who had run in the primary on an "Anyone but Edwards" platform. He ended up endorsing Edwards rather than Duke, who was the putative Republican candidate.

The resulting runoff campaign was widely seen as one of the dirtiest and most negative campaigns in recent history. Edwards and his supporters seized on Duke's record as a white supremacist; Duke responded by claiming to be a born-again Christian who had renounced racism and anti-Semitism after his conversion.

Nearly the entire Republican leadership rejected Duke's candidacy.  In a news conference, President George H. W. Bush condemned Duke as unfit for public office:

When someone has a long record, an ugly record, of racism and bigotry, that record simply cannot be erased by the glib rhetoric of a political campaign.  So I believe David Duke is an insincere charlatan.  I believe he's attempting to hoodwink the voters of Louisiana.  I believe he should be rejected for what he is and what he stands for.

Humorous unofficial bumper stickers were created in support of Edwards over Duke, despite Edwards' negative reputation. One bumper sticker read "Vote for the Lizard, not the Wizard", while another read "Vote For The Crook: It's Important."

Debate
The runoff debate, held on November 6, 1991, received significant attention when reporter Norman Robinson questioned Duke.  Robinson, who is African-American, told Duke that he was "scared" at the prospect of his winning the election because of his history of "diabolical, evil, vile" racist and anti-Semitic comments, some of which he read to Duke. He then pressed Duke for an apology.  When Duke protested that Robinson was not being fair to him, Robinson replied that he did not think Duke was being honest. Jason Berry of the Los Angeles Times called it "startling TV" and the "catalyst" for the "overwhelming" turnout of black voters that helped former Governor Edwin Edwards defeat Duke.

Results

First voting round, October 19

Runoff, November 16

Although he won only 26 of 64 parishes, Edwards finished first in the primary with 523,096 votes (33.76%). Duke finished second, carrying 31 parishes with 491,342 votes (31.71%). Roemer, the incumbent, finished third with 410,690 votes (26.51%) and carried seven parishes.  In the runoff, Edwards won the election with 1,057,031 votes. Most of the people who voted Roemer in the primary voted for Edwards in the runoff, helping Edwards win Jefferson and St. Tammany Parishes.

References

Sources 
First gubernatorial debate
Second gubernatorial debate
Third gubernatorial debate
Louisiana Secretary of State Elections Division.  Official Election Results Database
Statewide primary results, October 19, 1991
Primary results by parish: Governor, October 19, 1991
Statewide runoff results, November 16, 1991
Runoff results by parish: Governor, November 16, 1991
WWL-TV (New Orleans) coverage of runoff results
WDSU-TV (New Orleans) Coverage of Runoff Results (Via C-SPAN)

1991
Gubernatorial
Louisiana
October 1991 events in the United States
November 1991 events in the United States